Welcome to the Jungle is the debut and only studio album by British girl group Neon Jungle, released on 28 July 2014 by RCA Records.

Critical reception
Welcome to the Jungle received mixed to positive reviews from contemporary music critics, who commended the group as a whole and their originality, whilst some felt they had not yet "found their sound". Ally Carnwath of The Guardian called the album a "mixed bag, front-loaded with singles and with the requisite number of formulaic club bangers, but also containing some flashes of personality and nicely executed ideas". Stoke Sentinel was more positive, saying that the album "has even more to give [with] no filler tracks here". Helena Ho of Renowned for Sound gave the album 3 out of 5 stars and bemoaned its track listing, but she complimented individual tracks and called it "a solid debut from Neon Jungle, with a lot of ... standouts".

Cover versions
The song "Waiting Game" by Banks was covered on Welcome to the Jungle without the singer's knowledge. Her single of the song had debuted at No. 99 on the UK Singles Chart in January 2014 after being featured in a Victoria's Secret commercial, and was due to be featured on her debut album, Goddess.

Banks posted to her Facebook account that although the use of her song was apparently legal, she felt "really icky" that so personal a song had been used on another album before it could appear on hers. Helena Ho described the Neon Jungle version as a "mess" that is "horribly over-sung and nowhere near captures the sultriness of the original", while Rebecca Mattina was more positive, saying that while their version "doesn’t quite have the same deep and intense allure that Banks commands with her emotionally delicate vocals, I can’t deny the power Amira and Shereen bring to those runs at the end".

The album also contains a cover version of Hozier's "Take Me to Church".

Track listing

Charts

See also
List of UK top-ten albums in 2014

References 

2014 debut albums
RCA Records albums